Brian Jeffrey Krause (born February 1, 1969) is an American actor. He is known for his role as Leo Wyatt on The WB television series Charmed (1998–2006) and for portraying the lead role of Charles Brady in the 1992 horror film Sleepwalkers.

Early life
Krause was born in El Toro, California, the son of Alice and Jeff Krause. He has a brother named Patrick. Krause was adopted. He grew up in Southern California and took his first acting class at The Actors Workshop while in junior high. In his teens, he studied karate and attended El Toro High School, where he graduated in 1987. He continued his education at Orange Coast College.

Career
Krause landed his first role in 1989 as a student in the TV series TV 101. He then starred in the made-for-TV-movie Match Point, the CBS Schoolbreak Special "American Eyes", and An American Summer, before landing his first major role as Richard Lestrange, Jr. in the film Return to the Blue Lagoon (1991). He was a co-star in the Bandit series prior to his most notable role of Leo Wyatt, in The WB Network series Charmed (1998–2006). Krause originally auditioned for the role of Andy Trudeau but was cast as Piper's handyman/whitelighter love interest.

Due to budget restrictions in the eighth season (2005–06), he only appeared in the first 10 episodes and last two episodes. After Charmed, he has appeared in made-for-TV-movies and TV shows such as Mad Men (episode 2x12 The Mountain King), The Closer (episode 4x01 Controlled Burn), and Castle (episode 3x03 Under the Gun). He lent his voice and image to portray a minor character (Clem Feeney) in the videogame L.A. Noire, and he appeared in the YouTube video series Chad Vader, in Season 4, Episode 4: "The Return of Brian" (uploaded July 10, 2012), as himself, a former employee of Empire Market.

He starred as Ben in the 2012 film Ben and Becca, directed by Victor Alferi, written and produced by Bibi Amos, who also starred as Becca.

Filmography

Film

Television

Television movies and miniseries

Video Games

Other

References

External links

1969 births
20th-century American male actors
21st-century American male actors
American adoptees
American male film actors
American male television actors
Living people
Male actors from Orange County, California
Orange Coast College alumni
Male actors from Lake Forest, California